Theta Boötis, Latinized from θ Boötis, is a star in the northern constellation of Boötes the herdsman, forming a corner of the upraised left hand of this asterism. It has the traditional name Asellus Primus (Latin for "first donkey colt") and the Flamsteed designation 23 Boötis. Faintly visible to the naked eye, this star has a yellow-white hue with an apparent visual magnitude of 4.05. It is located at a distance of 47 light years from the Sun based on parallax, but is drifting closer with a radial velocity of −10.6 km/s.

Properties
The stellar classification of Theta Boötis is F7 V, matching an F-type main-sequence star. It is a solar-type star that may be near the end of its main sequence lifetime based on a high luminosity for a star of its type. Theta Boötis is a suspected variable star and a source of X-ray emission. There is evidence for low amplitude radial velocity variation of about 5 km/s. The star has a greater mass and a larger radius than the Sun. It is about 3–4 billion years old and is spinning with a projected rotational velocity of 29 km/s. The star is radiating 4.1 times the luminosity of the Sun from its photosphere at an effective temperature of 6,294 K.

There is a nearby 11th magnitude optical companion star about 70 arcseconds away. This is a class M2.5 red dwarf that is separated by a minimum of 1,000 AUs. It is uncertain whether they are gravitationally bound, but they do have a common motion through space and so the two stars probably share a common origin.

Nomenclature
θ Boötis, along with the other Aselli (ι Boo and κ Boo) and λ Boo, were Aulād al Dhiʼbah (أولاد الضّباع - awlād al-ḍibā‘), "the Whelps of the Hyenas".

References

External links
 CCDM J14252+5151
 HR 5404
 Image Theta Boötis

F-type main-sequence stars
Bootis, Theta
Suspected variables
M-type main-sequence stars
Binary stars

Boötes
Bootis, Theta
BD+52 1804
Bootis, 23
0549
126660
087379
5404
Asellus Primus